Ofterschwang is a municipality in southern Germany, in Oberallgäu, Bavaria. It is a professional winter sports venue, regularly used for World Cup alpine events.

References

Ski areas and resorts in Germany
Alpine skiing in Germany
Oberallgäu